Noël du Fail, seigneur de La Hérissaye (c. 1520 – 1591) was a French jurist and writer of the Renaissance.  His collections of tales are an important document of rural life in the sixteenth century in Brittany.

Biography
Noël du Fail was born into a rural noble family, at the family property of Château-Letard.  He studied law and obtained an office at the provincial courts in Rennes in 1552.  As magistrate, he wrote a collection of legal decisions from the Brittany parliament, Mémoires recueillis et extraits des plus notables et solennels arrests du Parlement de Bretagne (1579).

Du Fail is best known today for being one of the principal French story writers of the Renaissance, and especially as the author of the Propos rustiques (1547), a work which describes the life of two villages near Rennes (Vindelles and Flameaux) and, through the memories of four old peasants, gives portraits of some of their memorable inhabitants.  Alternating between a bucolic portrait and Rabelaisian humor, the complex, linguistically rich and often satirical work defies easy interpretation.  It is also one of the few works of the period to be entirely centered on peasant life.

His later texts—Baliverneries d'Eutrapel (1548) and Les Contes et Discours d’Eutrapel (1585)—are in roughly the same vein, but with noble characters at the center of the works: the prudent Polygame, the trickster Lupold and the joyous Eutrapel. The dialogue of the three men, mixing both moral reflection and irony, serves as a frame for a series of fables and descriptive portraits.  The short comic tales and anecdotes are at first glance merely amusing, but behind their light tone, verbal fantasy and amusing portraits lie profound moral, political and religious reflections (du Fail has been suspected of converting to Protestantism), linking du Fail to the other great humanists and story writers of Renaissance, such as Montaigne and Rabelais.

Du Fail died in Rennes.

Works

Original editions
 Propos rustiques de maistre Léon Ladulfi, champenois, Lyon, Jean de Tournes, 1547, in-8°
 Baliverneries d’Eutrapel, Paris, 1548.
 Les Contes et Discours d’Eutrapel, par le feu seigneur de la Herissaye gentilhomme breton, Rennes, Noël Glamet de Quinpercorentin, 1585, 8°.

Modern editions
 Propos rustiques de maistre Leon Ladulfi champenois, 1547, critical edition by Arthur de La Borderie with variants from the editions of 1548, 1549, 1573, Paris, Lemerre, 1878 (republished by Slatkine reprints, 1976).
 Propos rustiques de maistre Leon Ladulfi champenois, 1549, edition and introduction, notes et glossary by G.-A. Pérouse and R. Dubuis, Geneva, Droz, 1994.
 Propos rustiques, translation in modern French by Aline Leclercq-Magnien, Paris, Jean Picollec editions, 1988.
 Propos rustiques and Baliverneries in Conteurs français du XVIe siècle, Pierre Jourda, editor, Gallimard, La Pléiade, 1965.

References
This article is based on the article Noêl du Fail from the French Wikipedia, retrieved on October 4, 2006.
 Emmanuel Philipot, La vie et l’œuvre littéraire de Noël du Fail gentilhomme breton, Paris, Champion, 1914.
 Emmanuel Philipot, Essai sur le style et la langue de Noël du Fail, Paris, Champion, 1914.
 Gaël Milin, « Modèles idéologiques et modèles culturels dans l’œuvre narrative de Noël du Fail », in Annales de Bretagne et des Pays de l’Ouest, t. LXXXI, n°1, 1974.
 G.-A. Pérouse, « Le dessin des Propos rustiques », in Etudes seiziémistes offertes à V-L. Saulnier, Geneva, Droz, 1980.
 Denis Baril, « La peur des villes chez les paysans des contes de Noël du Fail », in La nouvelle française à la Renaissance, Geneva-Paris, Slatkine, 1981.
 Jean Larmat, « Variations sur des motifs rabelaisiens chez Noël du Fail », in Rabelais en son demi millénaire, Etudes rabelaisiennes, t. XXI, Droz, 1988.
 Noël du Fail écrivain, 15 articles on du Fail edited by Catherine Magnien-Simonin, Paris, Vrin, 1991.
 Romain Weber, « Contribution à l’étude du lexique des Propos rustiques de Noël du Fail : l’obstacle des locutions » in Bibliothèque Humanisme et Renaissance, LXV, n°2, Geneva, Droz, 2003.

External links
Contes et discours, 1587 edition Gallica (in French).
Contes et discours, Jouaust edition Gallica (in French).
Œuvres de du Fail, éd. Assezat Gallica (in French).
Contes et discours, éd. Guichard Gallica (in French).
Extracts from Baliverneries ou contes nouveaux d'Eutrapel (in French).
Les plus solemnels arrests et reglemens donnez au parlement de Bretagne, éd. 1715, tome premier; tome second, Cujas Library (in French).

1520s births
1591 deaths
Writers from Brittany
Writers from Rennes
French male writers
French male short story writers
French short story writers